Thiruvenkadu (also spelled Thiruvengadu) is a village in the Sirkazhi taluk of Mayiladuthurai district, India. Pincode of Thiruvenkadu village is 609114.

Demographics
Thiruvenkadu has the population of 8252, of which males are just 4126 while females are 4126. The literacy rate of Thiruvenkadu, as per 2011 census is 82.89 per cent.

Temples
Swetharanyeswarar Temple is a Hindu temple in Thiruvenkadu. The main deity is Swetharaneeswarar (Shiva) but there is a separate sannidhi (for Budhan (Mercury).

Villages in Mayiladuthurai district